The 2014–15 Binghamton Bearcats men's basketball team  represented Binghamton University during the 2014–15 NCAA Division I men's basketball season. The Bearcats, led by third year head coach Tommy Dempsey, played their home games at the Binghamton University Events Center and were members of the America East Conference. They finished the season 6–26, 5–11 in America East play to finis in seventh place. The lost in the quarterfinals of the America East tournament to Stony Brook.

Roster

Schedule

|-
!colspan=9 style="background:#006B54; color:#FFFFFF;"| Exhibition

|-
!colspan=9 style="background:#006B54; color:#FFFFFF;"| Regular season

|-
!colspan=9 style="background:#006B54; color:#FFFFFF;"| America East tournament

References

Binghamton Bearcats men's basketball seasons
Binghamton
Bingham Bear
Bingham Bear